The 2013 Uttarakhand Municipal general elections were held in the Indian state of Uttarakhand on 28 April 2013.

The Uttarakhand State Election Commission announced the poll dates on 5 April 2013. The results were declared on 30 April 2013.

Elections are not held in the nagar panchayats of Badrinath, Kedarnath and Gangotri due to their status of temporary settlements. Local interim administration councils administer these three pilgrimage sites for a period of six months during the summers.

Results

Municipal Corporation Mayoral results

Municipal general election results

See also
2013 Dehradun Municipal Corporation election
2013 Haridwar Municipal Corporation election
2013 elections in India

References

External links 

 http://sec.uk.gov.in/files/election-2013/58_Adhisuchana.pdf
 http://sec.uk.gov.in/files/election-2013/Adhisoochna_2013.pdf

Local elections in Uttarakhand